The 1994–95 Vancouver Canucks season was the team's 25th NHL campaign. Goaltender Kirk McLean earned all eighteen of the Canucks' wins during the lockout-shortened, 48–game season. Pavel Bure was not the same offensive dynamo that he had been over the prior two seasons, each of which saw him hit the 60-goal mark, but he did still lead the club in goals (20), assists (23, and tied with Jeff Brown), points (43) and shots (198). A trade with the Dallas Stars on April 7, 1995, saw Russ Courtnall join his brother Geoff on the Canucks. The team finished the season with as many wins as losses, good for 6th place in the Western Conference, and they led the league with 12 ties. This was also the team's final season at the Pacific Coliseum before moving to GM Place, now known as Rogers Arena.

Regular season

Schedule and results
Note: R = result

Playoffs
In the post-season, Vancouver was the clear underdog against the third-place St. Louis Blues, who had members from the 1994 Stanley-Cup champion Rangers team, as well as their head coach, Mike Keenan. After losing game one at the Kiel Center by a score of 2–1, the Canucks won game two by a score of 5–3 behind Kirk McLean's 33-save performance and Pavel Bure's shorthanded insurance goal in the third period. The shots on goal were 26 for Vancouver and 36 for St. Louis, as they had been in the first game. The Canucks carried over their momentum from their win in game two to the Pacific Coliseum for game three, where they triumphed 6–1. Sergio Momesso scored twice. The Canucks were looking to win game four as well, leading 2–1 after Russ Courtnall's shorthanded goal at 4:41 of the second period. But the Blues got their jump from Brendan Shanahan who scored a natural hat trick to give the Blues a 4–2 lead. Glenn Anderson would add another goal at 13:01 of the third period as St. Louis went on to win 5–2 to square the series at two games apiece. In game five at the Kiel Center, the Canucks scored four times on their first 19 shots, as Curtis Joseph would be pulled in favor of Jon Casey. Trailing Vancouver 5–4 with under 12 minutes to play, Murray Baron tied the game at 8:22 of the third period. The game would go into overtime where Cliff Ronning scored at 1:48 of the first overtime period to give the Canucks a 3–2 lead in the series.

Looking to close out the series at home in game six, the Canucks were dominated by the Blues who won by a score of 8–2. Esa Tikkanen (who would soon become a Canuck himself) picked up four points in the game (2 goals and 2 assists). Kirk McLean allowed six goals on just 17 shots. With the series tied at 3–3, a crucial game seven in St. Louis took place on Friday, May 19. Although the Blues had twice as many shots as the Canucks (44–22), Curtis Joseph allowed 4 goals on 21 shots while Kirk McLean made 41 saves. Call-up rookie Adrian Aucoin began a successful NHL career by blasting a slapshot on the power-play to give the Canucks the lead, and Pavel Bure added an empty-net goal with 22 seconds remaining to seal the game 5–3 and earn the Canucks a 4–3 series win. It was Bure's seventh goal of the playoffs. It was a series with marked offensive output, as each team scored 27 goals over the seven games. The Canucks' special teams dominated throughout, as Vancouver scored 11 power-play goals and six short-handed goals in the series.

In the second round, the Canucks faced the Chicago Blackhawks. Both teams skated to a 1–1 tie before Joe Murphy scored the winner at 9:04 of the first overtime period. Blackhawks goaltender Ed Belfour stopped 26 of 27 Vancouver shots. Game two was also close, as Chicago edged Vancouver 2–0 on goals by Jim Cummins and Patrick Poulin. Down two games to none in the series, the Canucks battled desperately to get a win at home in game three, but relinquished leads of 1–0 and 2–1. Ironically it was ex-Canuck Murray Craven who tied the game at 2–2 with 45 seconds remaining in the third period to send the game to overtime. Chris Chelios scored at 6:22 of the first overtime period as the Hawks took a commanding three-games-to-none series lead. In game four, Vancouver broke a 1–1 tie on two goals by Roman Oksiuta to lead 3–1 in the second period, but Chicago came back again on goals by another ex-Canuck Gerald Diduck and Jeremy Roenick, leaving the score after 60 minutes tied at three goals apiece. Once again, the overtime hero was Chris Chelios, who scored 5:35 into the extra frame to give the Blackhawks a 4–0 sweep over the Canucks, advancing them to the third round for the first time in three years.

Conference Quarterfinals

(3) St. Louis Blues vs. (6) Vancouver Canucks
This was first playoff meeting between these two teams.

Conference Semifinals

(4) Chicago Blackhawks vs. (6) Vancouver Canucks

This was the second playoff meeting between these two teams; with Vancouver winning the only previous series. They last met in the 1982 Clarence Campbell Conference Final, which Vancouver won in five games.

Game four was the last game played in the Pacific Coliseum.

Player statistics

Regular season

Scoring leaders
Source: Hockey-Reference.com

Note: Pos = Position; GP = Games played; G = Goals; A = Assists; Pts = Points; +/- = Plus/minus; PIM = Penalty minutes; PPG = Power-play goals; SHG = Shorthanded Goals; GWG = Game Winning Goals

Goaltending
Note: GP = Games played; TOI = Time on ice (minutes); W = Wins; L = Losses; T = Ties; GA = Goals against; SO = Shutouts; Sv% = Save percentage; GAA = Goals Against Average

Playoffs

Scoring leaders
Note: GP = Games played; G = Goals; A = Assists; Pts = Points; +/- = Plus/minus; PIM = Penalty Minutes

Goaltending
Note: GP = Games played; TOI = Time on ice (minutes); W = Wins; L = Losses; GA = Goals against; SO = Shutouts; Sv% = Save percentage; GAA = Goals Against Average

Draft picks
Vancouver's draft picks at the 1994 NHL Entry Draft held at the Hartford Civic Center in Hartford, Connecticut.

References

Vancouver Canucks seasons
Vancouver C
Vancouver